The Hunt, later de Vere Baronetcy, of Curragh in the County of Limerick, was a title in the Baronetage of Ireland. It was created on 4 December 1784 for Vere Hunt, who subsequently represented Askeaton in the Irish House of Commons. The second Baronet assumed the surname of de Vere in lieu of his patronymic in 1832. The fourth Baronet represented County Limerick in Parliament. The title became extinct on his death in 1904.

The Hunt/de Vere family estate for 300 years (1657–1957), including the period of the Baronetcy of Curragh, is the present day Curraghchase Forest Park, in County Limerick.

The second Baronet was a noted poet whose third son, Aubrey Thomas de Vere, was a renowned poet and critic.

Hunt, later de Vere baronets, of Curragh (1784)
Sir Vere Hunt, 1st Baronet (1761–1818)
Sir Aubrey (Hunt) de Vere, 2nd Baronet (1788–1846)
Sir Vere Edmond de Vere, 3rd Baronet (1808–1880)
Sir Stephen Edward de Vere, 4th Baronet (1812–1904)

References

 George Edward Cokayne, The Complete Baronetage, volume VI (Exeter, 1906) pages 414–416

Extinct baronetcies in the Baronetage of Ireland
De Vere family